Polemograptis rubristria is a species of moth of the family Tortricidae and arthropoda phylum. It is found on Peninsular Malaysia and Borneo.

References

Moths described in 1966
Tortricini
Moths of Malaysia
Moths of Indonesia
Taxa named by Józef Razowski